Horticultural Hall (also known as 'Horti Hall') is a building in Melbourne, Australia located on Victoria Street near the corner of Russell Street.

The hall was commissioned by the Victorian Horticultural Improvement Society and opened in 1873. The two-storey brick building facing Victoria Street was added in 1878.

Over its history it has housed many different organisations and events. It is currently the headquarters for Victorian Opera.

References 

Heritage-listed buildings in Melbourne
Victorian architecture in Victoria (Australia)
Buildings and structures in Melbourne City Centre
Buildings and structures completed in 1873
1873 establishments in Australia